Hoplistoscelis is a genus of damsel bugs in the family Nabidae. There are about eight described species in Hoplistoscelis.

Species
These eight species belong to the genus Hoplistoscelis:
 Hoplistoscelis confusa Kerzhner & Henry
 Hoplistoscelis dentipes (Harris, 1928)
 Hoplistoscelis heidemanni (Reuter, 1908)
 Hoplistoscelis hubbelli (Hussey, 1953)
 Hoplistoscelis nigriventris (Stål, 1862)
 Hoplistoscelis pallescens
 Hoplistoscelis sericans (Reuter, 1872)
 Hoplistoscelis sordidus (Reuter, 1872)

References

Further reading

External links

 

Nabidae
Articles created by Qbugbot